Jordan competed at the 2020 Summer Olympics in Tokyo. Originally scheduled to take place during the summer of 2020, the Games were postponed to 23 July to 8 August 2021, because of the COVID-19 pandemic. It was the nation's 11th consecutive appearance at the Summer Olympics.

Medalists

Competitors
The following is a list of the number of Jordanian competitors in the Games.

Athletics

Jordan received a universality slot from the World Athletics to send a female track and field athlete to the Olympics.

Track & road events

Boxing

Jordan entered five male boxers into the Olympic tournament. Rio 2016 Olympians Obada Al-Kasbeh (men's lightweight), Hussein Ishaish (men's super heavyweight) and his brother Zeyad (men's welterweight), along with two other rookies (Al-Wadi and Al-Hindawi), secured the spots on the Jordanian squad by advancing to the semifinal match of their respective weight divisions at the 2020 Asia & Oceania Qualification Tournament in Amman.

Equestrian

Jordan entered one jumping rider into the Olympic competition by finishing in the top two, outside the group selection, of the individual FEI Olympic Rankings for Group F (Africa and Middle East), marking the country's recurrence to the sport after an eight-year absence.

Jumping

Judo
 
Jordan entered one male judoka into the Olympic tournament based on the International Judo Federation Olympics Individual Ranking.

Karate
 
Jordan entered one karateka into the inaugural Olympic tournament. Abdelrahman Al-Masatfa qualified directly for the men's kumite 67 kg category by finishing second in the final pool round at the 2021 World Olympic Qualification Tournament in Paris, France.

Shooting

Jordan granted an invitation from ISSF to send Asma Abu Rabee in the women's 10 m air pistol to the Olympics, based on her minimum qualifying score (MQS) attained on or before June 6, 2021, marking the country's return to the sport for the first time since Sydney 2000.

Women

Swimming

Jordan received a universality invitation from FINA to send two top-ranked swimmers (one per gender) in their respective individual events to the Olympics, based on the FINA Points System of June 28, 2021.

Taekwondo

Jordan entered two athletes into the taekwondo competition at the Games. Saleh El-Sharabaty (men's 80 kg) and reigning Asian Games champion Julyana Al-Sadeq (women's 67 kg) secured the spots on the Jordanian taekwondo squad with a top two finish each in their respective weight classes at the 2021 Asian Qualification Tournament in Amman.

References

Nations at the 2020 Summer Olympics
2020
2021 in Jordanian sport